IAAP may refer to:

 International Association for Analytical Psychology
 International Association of Accessibility Professionals
 International Association of Administrative Professionals
 Iowa Army Ammunition Plant